Casper Ruud (born 22 December 1998) is a Norwegian professional tennis player. Ruud has a career-high singles ranking of world No. 2, achieved on 12 September 2022, making him the highest-ranked Norwegian tennis player in history. He has won nine ATP Tour singles titles, eight of which were on clay courts. Ruud is the first Norwegian man to win an ATP singles title, to reach major finals (at the 2022 French Open and US Open finals), to reach a Masters 1000 final, and to enter the top 20 in the ATP rankings. He also reached the final of the 2022 ATP Finals.  In doubles, he has a career-high ranking of world No. 133, achieved after reaching the quarterfinals of the 2021 Wimbledon Championships. Revered for his professional on-court demeanour, he was awarded the Stefan Edberg Sportsmanship Award in 2022.

Career

Junior tennis
Ruud reached the third round of the 2015 French Open boys' singles event, losing to Corentin Denolly. He also reached the third round of the 2015 US Open boys' singles and the second round of the 2015 Wimbledon boys' singles, his best singles performances in the respective competitions in Junior Grand Slams.

In the 2015 Wimbledon Boys' Doubles, Ruud made it to the semifinals together with partner Miomir Kecmanović, before losing to eventual champions Lý Hoàng Nam and Sumit Nagal. They were eliminated in the first round of the 2015 US Open Boys' Doubles. In 2016, Ruud and Kecmanović reached the semifinals of the 2016 French Open Boys' Doubles before losing to Youssef Hossam and Jurabek Karimov.

2016: Junior No. 1 and professional debut
Ruud started the year as the world No. 1 ranked Junior player on 4 January, making him the first Norwegian to do so.

For the 2016 season, Ruud set his goals on playing Futures tournaments and start climbing the ATP rankings. In February, he played his first Futures final, which he ended up winning against Carlos Taberner in Paguera, Spain.

He has since played four more finals, winning one of them against Mikael Torpegaard in Kaarina, Finland in August.

In September,  in his first ever ATP Challenger tournament, Ruud managed to win the Copa Sevilla after beating Taro Daniel in the final. By winning on his debut Ruud became the fourth-youngest to ever do so. In the tournament, he recorded his first wins over players ranked in the top 150. He knocked-out top seed Iñigo Cervantes in the quarterfinals, who at the time was ranked No. 75 in the ATP rankings. Due to his win in his Challenger debut, Ruud received a wildcard to the 2016 Chengdu Open, his first ATP World Tour 250 series tournament. Ruud lost to Viktor Troicki in the first round.

Ruud also qualified for the ITF Junior Masters, where he reached the final, losing to Hong Seong-chan.

Ruud finished 2016 with a career high ranking of No. 225 in the ATP rankings.

2017: ATP 500 semifinals and top 150
After impressing in 2016 and climbing the ATP ranking, Ruud lost in the third and final qualifying round of the 2017 Australian Open to Reilly Opelka. Ruud then received a wildcard into the ATP 500 event 2017 Rio Open where he defeated Rogério Dutra Silva, Roberto Carballés Baena, and Thiago Monteiro to advance to his first ATP level semifinal. This made him the youngest to reach an ATP 500 semifinal since Borna Ćorić at the 2014 Swiss Indoors. Ruud was defeated by Pablo Carreño Busta in the semifinals but reached a career-high ranking of No. 133. Ruud received a wildcard into the 2017 Miami Open, marking his first appearance at an ATP Masters 1000 tournament.

2018: Major debuts
In 2018, Ruud qualified for his first Grand Slam at the Australian Open after going through the qualifying competition. This made him the first Norwegian to qualify for a Grand Slam main draw in 17 years. He won in the first round against Quentin Halys before losing to Diego Schwartzman in the second round. He would lose to Schwartzman again at the Rio Open. Later on in the season he showed continuous good form and reached two ATP Challenger finals in two weeks. The first one he lost against Italian Gianluigi Quinzi in Francavilla al Mare and then he lost to Pedro Sousa in the Braga Open two weeks later. A few weeks later Ruud continued his good form and qualified for the main draw of the French Open for the first time after going through the qualifiers without losing a set. In the first round he defeated Jordan Thompson to match his achievement at the Australian Open. He lost to Albert Ramos Viñolas in the second round. In July he achieved the biggest win of his career thus far when he beat defending champion and former world No. 3, David Ferrer in straight sets at the 2018 Swedish Open. Later that year Ruud qualified for the US Open for the first time, going through the qualifiers without dropping a set. He lost to Guido Pella in the first round. After struggling with finding consistency in his form after the summer, Ruud finished off the 2018 season by reaching the semifinal of three consecutive Challenger Tournaments, which brought him close to his career high ATP ranking going into a new season at No. 112.

2019: Top 100 and NextGen ATP Finals

In the 2019 season, Ruud lost in the first qualifying round at the Australian Open, but qualified for the Rio Open, and won against Carlos Berlocq and fifth seed João Sousa before losing to Laslo Đere in two sets. The result saw him climb to a tied career high ranking of 108. The following week he reached the semifinal of the Brasil Open, beating Thiago Monteiro, top seed João Sousa and Hugo Dellien before losing to Christian Garín in two sets. The result meant that Ruud climbed inside the top 100 on the ATP rankings for the first time of his career the following week with a ranking of No. 94 becoming the first Norwegian to do so since his father, Christian Ruud, in December 1994.

In April, at the U.S. Clay Court Championships, Ruud reached his first ever ATP Tour level final. In the final he lost to Cristian Garín, though his result meant that he equaled his father Christian Ruud in reaching the final of an ATP Tour event, being the only two Norwegians to do so.

At the Italian Open, Ruud won his first match in an ATP Tour Masters 1000 tournament. After coming through the qualifiers he went on to beat Dan Evans and Nick Kyrgios before losing in the third round to Juan Martín del Potro in straight sets. At the French Open, Ruud beat Ernests Gulbis and 29th seed Matteo Berrettini before losing in straight sets against Roger Federer in the third round. Ruud also reached the second round at the doubles event alongside Miomir Kecmanović after knocking out former winners and 12th seed Ivan Dodig and Édouard Roger-Vasselin before losing in three sets to Federico Delbonis and Guillermo Durán.

In July, Ruud played his first Wimbledon Championships, losing in the first round to ninth seed John Isner. At the Kitzbühel Open Ruud made it to the semifinals after beating Pablo Carreño Busta, Matthias Bachinger and Pablo Cuevas before losing to Albert Ramos Viñolas. At the 2019 US Open, Ruud once again teamed up with Miomir Kecmanović in doubles. They made it to the third round after eliminating third seeds Raven Klaasen and Michael Venus in the second round. At the St. Petersburg Open, he made the quarterfinals before losing in three sets to Borna Ćorić. After his best season so far, Ruud qualified for the 2019 Next Generation ATP Finals where he got knocked out in the round robin.

2020: First ATP title and top 25
At the 2020 ATP Cup Ruud led Norway to a 2–1 victory over the U.S. team in the first round-robin match by beating John Isner in three tight sets, before teaming up with Viktor Durasovic to beat Austin Krajicek and Rajeev Ram in doubles. In the second round robin singles match, Ruud beat world No. 12, Fabio Fognini, in straight sets.

In February, Ruud made his way to the final of the Argentina Open where he defeated Pedro Sousa in the final, thus becoming the first tennis player from Norway to win an ATP Tour title and also appear in more than one ATP Tour final. At the same time he surpassed his father Christian's ranking of No. 39 on the ATP ranking, setting a new record as the highest ranked Norwegian player in ATP history with a ranking of No. 34 the following week on 17 February 2020.

Two weeks after his first title, Ruud reached his second final in a month at the Chile Open but lost in three sets against Thiago Seyboth Wild.

At the US Open, he reached the third round after defeating Mackenzie McDonald in a five-set match in the first round. In the second round he faced Emil Ruusuvuori, who retired in the third set. Ruud moved to the third round but was defeated in straight sets by Matteo Berrettini.

At the Italian Open, Ruud notched four match wins, including a quarterfinal victory over top 10 player Matteo Berrettini, to reach that tournament's semifinals as the first ever Norwegian, once again surpassing the record of his father Christian Ruud who reached the quarterfinals of Monte Carlo in 1997. Casper then lost in two sets to Novak Djokovic in the semifinals. The result sent him up to a new career high of No. 30 the following week. Another semifinal at the 2020 Hamburg European Open the following week sent him up to No. 25 in the rankings. At the French Open, Ruud once again reached the third round where was then beaten by Dominic Thiem.

2021: Five titles and top 10 debut

At the Australian Open, Ruud progressed to the fourth round in a major for the first time. He beat Jordan Thompson, Tommy Paul and Radu Albot before retiring against Andrey Rublev, after losing the first two sets. The result equalled his father's best placement at the Australian Open and a major. Ruud reentered the top 25 to a career-high ranking of No. 24, on 22 February 2021. A few weeks later, he reached the quarterfinals at Acapulco but once again withdrew due to injury before his match against Alexander Zverev started.

On his debut at the Monte-Carlo Masters, Ruud recorded his second top-10 win after beating Diego Schwartzman, in straight sets in the second round. He then defeated Pablo Carreño Busta and defending champion Fabio Fognini to reach his second Masters 1000 semifinal, where he lost to Andrey Rublev. At the BMW Open, Ruud reached the semifinals before losing in straight sets to Nikoloz Basilashvili. At the Madrid Open in another debut, Ruud recorded his first top-5 win in the third round by defeating Stefanos Tsitsipas in straight sets. He went on to record a straight sets victory in the quarterfinals over Alexander Bublik to reach his third straight ATP Masters 1000 semifinal on clay. He lost his semifinal match to Matteo Berrettini. Due to his performance in Madrid, Ruud entered the top 20 for the first time in his career, rising to a new career-high ranking of No. 16 on 10 May 2021.

At the Geneva Open, Ruud reached his fourth consecutive semifinal on the ATP Tour and then reached his first final of the year and fourth final in his career, after defeating Pablo Andújar in straight sets. He defeated Denis Shapovalov in straight sets to win his second ATP title.

At Wimbledon, Ruud and his partner André Göransson made the quarterfinals of the men's doubles tournament. As a result he climbed to a career-high in doubles of world No. 133, on 12 July 2021.

At the Swedish Open, Ruud won his second title of the year and third in total after beating Federico Coria in the final. The following week, Ruud won his third title of 2021 with victory at the Swiss Open, beating Hugo Gaston in the final. Ruud would then claim victory a week later in Kitzbühel, defeating Pedro Martínez in the final, to win his fourth title of the season and fifth of his career. As a result, Ruud moved up to a new career-high of No. 12 on 2 August 2021. He became the first ATP player since Andy Murray in October 2011 to win three titles in as many weeks. His winning streak ended at the Canada Masters when he was defeated in the quarterfinals by Stefanos Tsitsipas. Nevertheless, he reached a new career-high of world No. 11 on 16 August 2021. The following week he entered another Masters 1000 quarterfinal at the 2021 Cincinnati Masters but lost to Alexander Zverev in straight sets.

On 13 September, Ruud reached the No. 10 ranking in the world, becoming a top 10 player for the first time and the first Norwegian player to accomplish this feat. At 22, he was also the youngest player in the Top 10.

At the end of September, Ruud was selected to play the 2021 Laver Cup for team Europe. He won the first match of the tournament against Reilly Opelka in a tournament team Europe went on to win 14–1.

At the start of October, Ruud won his first ever hardcourt tournament and his fifth tour-leading tournament of the year at the San Diego Open. He defeated Andy Murray, Lorenzo Sonego, Grigor Dimitrov and in the final Cameron Norrie in two sets in 62 minutes.

Ruud began his Rolex Paris Masters run by defeating Alexander Bublik in straight sets. His third round victory over Marcos Giron confirmed Ruud’s spot at the ATP Finals, where he made his debut at the year-end championships.

At the ATP Finals, Ruud reached the semifinals after losing to Novak Djokovic before beating Cameron Norrie and Andrey Rublev in the round robin. In the semifinal Ruud lost in straight sets to Daniil Medvedev.

Ruud finished the year as world No. 8 in the singles rankings.

2022: Two Grand Slam & ATP Finals finals, ATP Sportsman of the Year, and world No. 2

Ruud was drawn to play Alex Molčan on the first round in Australian Open, however, he withdrew due to an ankle injury sustained during the practice.

Shortly after his recovery, he entered the Argentina Open at which he defeated Diego Schwartzman in the final and clinched his seventh career ATP singles title.

He reached his fourth Masters 1000 semifinal at the Miami Open by defeating Henri Laaksonen, Alexander Bublik, and Cameron Norrie, and later earning his first win against world No. 4, Alexander Zverev, in the quarterfinal. Ruud then defeated Francisco Cerúndolo in the semifinals to advance to his first Masters 1000 Final. In the final he lost to 18-year-old Carlos Alcaraz in straight sets. Following this result, Ruud reached a career high ranking of No. 7 in the world on 4 April 2022.

At the Italian Open, Ruud reached the semifinals by defeating 13th seed Denis Shapovalov before losing to world No. 1, Novak Djokovic. He next defended his title at the Geneva Open, defeating João Sousa in the longest championship match of the season in both time (3 hours 4 minutes) and games (36). He became the sixth player to win multiple tour-level titles in 2022.

At the French Open, Ruud defeated Jo-Wilfried Tsonga, who was playing his last professional match, Emil Ruusuvuori, Lorenzo Sonego, and 12th seed Hubert Hurkacz to advance to his first ever major quarterfinal, becoming the first Norwegian to reach the fourth round and beyond at this major. In the first all-Scandinavian French Open quarterfinal, he defeated Holger Rune to set up a match with also first-time Roland Garros semifinalist Marin Čilić. He reached the final with a four sets win over Cilic, and became the first Norwegian man in history to reach a Grand Slam final.
 He fell in straight sets to Rafael Nadal, but as a result of his performance he moved to a new career-high singles ranking of world No. 6 on 6 June 2022 and to world No. 5 a week later.

At the Wimbledon Championships, he recorded his maiden win at this major defeating Albert Ramos-Vinolas and also his 150th career win.

In July, Ruud won the Swiss Open Gstaad for the second year in a row and his ninth ATP title overall, after defeating Matteo Berrettini in the final, improving his tour-level record in Switzerland to 16-0. At the Canadian Open, Ruud defeated Félix Auger-Aliassime in the quarterfinals. In the semifinals, he lost to Hubert Hurkacz in a three sets, but switched back to world No. 5. At the Cincinnati Masters, Ruud was stunned by University of Florida sophomore Ben Shelton in the second round.

At the US Open, Ruud was one of five players in the draw with a shot at the world No. 1 ranking (the others being Medvedev, Tsitsipas, Nadal and Alcaraz). He reached the fourth round by defeating Kyle Edmund, Tim van Rijthoven, and Tommy Paul; his third round match with Paul went five sets and lasted almost four and a half hours. He then defeated lucky loser Corentin Moutet, 13th seed Matteo Berrettini, the latter in straight sets, to make his second major semifinal appearance. He went on to defeat 27th seed Karen Khachanov to reach his second major final. He lost to the 3rd seed Carlos Alcaraz in the final in four sets. As a result, he climbed to a new career-high ranking of world No. 2 on 12 September 2022.

At the 2022 ATP Finals he went one step further then the previous year when he reached the final defeating Andrey Rublev and setting up a match with five-time champion Novak Djokovic. In the finals, Ruud lost to Novak Djokovic in straight sets.

Ruud also won the ATP Sportsman of the Year award for his behavior on tour.

2023
Ruud started off the season by participating in the inaugural 2023 United Cup leading the Norway team. He won his first match in the tournament against Thiago Monteiro but in his second match lost against Matteo Berrettini. The Norway team failed to advance to the knockout stage.

In January 2023, Ruud criticized the length of the ATP Tour calendar and said he would take around a month's break from competition after the 2023 Australian Open, with February effectively his pre-season.

National representation

Davis Cup
He became a part of the Norwegian Davis Cup team in 2015, and together with countryman Viktor Durasovic promoted Norway from Group Three Europe Zone to Group Two Europe/Africa Zone.

In the 2016 Davis Cup, Ruud and Durasovic lost 3–2 to Lithuania in the first round. In the playoffs they beat Luxembourg 3–2 to stay in the Group Two Europe/Africa Zone. Norway remained in Group Two Europe/Africa Zone in 2017 and 2018 before winning their 2019 tie against Georgia, securing them a place in the playoff for World Group I as a result of changes in the Davis Cup format. They won the playoff against Barbados and thereby qualified for World Group I.

Personal life
Ruud is the son of former professional tennis player Christian Ruud and Lele Ruud. He has two sisters, Caroline and Charlotte, and shares a passion for golf with his father. He grew up in the Snarøya district of Bærum, with Rafael Nadal as his tennis idol.

Career statistics

Grand Slam tournament performance timelines

Current through the 2022 US Open.

Singles

Doubles

Significant finals

Grand Slam tournament finals

Singles: 2 (2 runner-ups)

Year-end championship finals

Singles: 1 (1 runner-up)

Masters 1000 finals

Singles: 1 (1 runner-up)

Awards
 Nominated - ATP Most Improved Player of the Year (2021)
 Nominated - ATP Stefan Edberg Sportsmanship Award (2021)
 Won - ATP Stefan Edberg Sportsmanship Award (2022)

References

External links

 
 
 
 
 
 Casper Ruud at Tennis Board

1998 births
Living people
Norwegian male tennis players
People from Oslo
Sportspeople from Bærum